Raputia is a genus of flowering plants belonging to the family Rutaceae.

Its native range is Southern Tropical America.

Species:

Raputia amazonica 
Raputia aromatica 
Raputia brevipedunculata 
Raputia codo-pozuzoensis 
Raputia hirsuta 
Raputia maroana 
Raputia megalantha 
Raputia neblinensis 
Raputia praetermissa 
Raputia simulans 
Raputia szczerbanii 
Raputia ulei

References

Zanthoxyloideae genera
Zanthoxyloideae